This is a list of notable railway track gauge conversions, railway lines where the distance between a set of tracks is broadened or narrowed. Conversions to broader gauge are generally to accommodate heavier loads or for wider cars, while conversions to narrower gauge tend to be for compatibility with other lines on a rail network. This list also contains instances of lines already prepared for conversion and those which are planned to be converted.

See also 

 Break-of-gauge

References 

Track gauges
Track